Juzet may refer to two communes in the Haute-Garonne department in southwestern France:
 Juzet-de-Luchon
 Juzet-d'Izaut